Dorysthenes zivetta is a species of longhorn beetles in the subfamily Prioninae.

Records of occurrence are from India, Nepal and China; the subspecies Dorysthenes zivetta laosensis Gressitt & Rondon, 1970 occurs in Indo-China.

References

External links 
 

Prioninae
Insects of Asia